Chelsea Louise Ashurst (born 22 April 1990) is an English professional footballer who plays as a goalkeeper for Spanish Liga F club Sporting de Huelva.

Ashurst was born in Normanton in West Yorkshire, in the north of England, but moved to Granada in Andalusia, in the south of Spain, as a child. Raised in Granada, she has spent her whole football career in Spain.

Ashurst began playing football several years after moving to Spain, and tried out goalkeeping at about fourteen; she joined Club Atlético Málaga in Spain's top division at the age of fifteen.

Honours
Barcelona
Primera División: 2013–14, 2014–15
Copa de la Reina: 2014

References

External links

1990 births
Sportspeople from Normanton, West Yorkshire
Footballers from Wakefield
English women's footballers
Women's association football goalkeepers
Málaga CF Femenino players
FC Barcelona Femení players
Sporting de Huelva players
English expatriate sportspeople in Spain
Expatriate women's footballers in Spain
Primera División (women) players
Living people